The 3rd General Command (formerly the General Command of the Duchies) was the overall command of all Royal Danish Army units in Duchies of Holstein and Lauenburg. The command was abolished following Denmark's loss of Schleswig-Holstein, following the Second Schleswig War.

Commanders

General Command of the Duchies (1739–1852)

General Command of Holstein and Lauenburg (1852–1855)

3rd General command (1855–1864)

Names

Notes

Ref

Sources
 
 
 
 
 
 
 

Army units and formations of Denmark